Guy Francis (16 August 1860 – 18 May 1948) was an English cricketer. He played for Gloucestershire between 1884 and 1888.

References

1860 births
1948 deaths
English cricketers
Gloucestershire cricketers
People from Cotswold District
Sportspeople from Gloucestershire
North v South cricketers